Lisinski is a 1944 film directed by Oktavijan Miletić about the life of Croatian composer Vatroslav Lisinski. Music for the film was recorded by Boris Papandopulo.

A restored copy of the film was released in 2009. Jutarnji list declared the movie the best Croatian release of the year.

References

Further reading

External links 

1944 films
Croatian-language films
Films about classical music and musicians
Croatian biographical films
Films set in the 19th century
Films about composers
1940s biographical films
Croatian black-and-white films